Hypsoblennius caulopus, the tidepool blenny, is a species of combtooth blenny found among rocky reefs of the eastern Pacific ocean.  This species grows to a length of  TL.

References

caulopus
Fish described in 1898